Noah Cornelius Marmaduke Huntley (born 7 September 1974) is an English actor and model. He has appeared in films such as 28 Days Later (2002), The Chronicles of Narnia: The Lion, the Witch and the Wardrobe (2005), Snow White and the Huntsman (2012) and Dracula Untold (2014).

Background
Huntley was born in Wiston, West Sussex, the son of Karen and Graham Huntley. He grew up as one of eight on a Sussex farm. He was educated at Windlesham House School in Pulborough, Sussex, Our Lady of Sion School in Worthing,  at Leighton Park School in Berkshire, and Collyer’s IV Form College in Horsham, Sussex. Huntley lives between England and America and he is a vegetarian. 

His early acting career included roles in Birds of a Feather, he also played Luke McAllister from 1993 to 1995 in the British soap opera Emmerdale. He went on to star alongside Dominic West and Josh Lucas in True Blue and alongside Laurence Fishburne and Sam Neill in Event Horizon. 

He then returned to TV, playing Harchester United Captain, Michael Dillon in the football drama Dream Team. In 2002, he starred in Danny Boyle's 28 Days Later alongside Cillian Murphy and Naomie Harris.  He played Will Curtis in Holby City for the 2004–05 season and then went on to appear in numerous other feature films, including Snow White and the Huntsman in 2012 and Dracula Untold in 2015. In 2015 he also played the lover of Elizabeth Hurley's character in a multi-episode arc of the E! original series The Royals. Huntley has been filming a pilot in Northern Ireland of The Pardoner's Tale, and since 2019 he has been working as a series regular on the CW science fiction series Pandora, playing Professor Donovan Osborn.

As a fashion model, he has appeared in campaigns for Bloomingdales, Paul Smith, Jigsaw, Cacharel and Nautica. He has shot with Annie Leibovitz for Stella Artois and Peter Lindbergh for L'Oreal. He has also appeared as a model in international editions of Vogue Hommes, Esquire and GQ.

Filmography

Film

Television

References

External links
 

1974 births
20th-century English male actors
21st-century English male actors
English male child actors
English male film actors
English male television actors
English male models
Living people
Male actors from Sussex
People educated at Leighton Park School
People educated at Our Lady of Sion School
People educated at Windlesham House School
People from Wiston, West Sussex